Thomas Bibiris (born 7 March 1985) is a Greek footballer who plays for Rodos F.C. in the Beta Ethniki.

Career
Born in Kozani, Bibiris began his professional career with Akratitos F.C., where he appeared in four Greek Super League matches.

References

External links
Profile at Onsports.gr

1985 births
Living people
Greek footballers
A.P.O. Akratitos Ano Liosia players
Vyzas F.C. players
Rodos F.C. players
Association football midfielders
Footballers from Kozani